Braniff Bonaventure (born April 21, 1973) is a former American football quarterback who played two seasons in the Arena Football League with the Florida Bobcats and Orlando Predators. He played college football at Furman University and attended Dr. Phillips High School in Orlando, Florida. He has been a high school and college coach after his playing career.

References

External links
Just Sports Stats

Living people
1973 births
Players of American football from Florida
American football quarterbacks
Furman Paladins football players
Florida Bobcats players
Orlando Predators players
Sportspeople from Orlando, Florida
Dr. Phillips High School alumni